The 1996–97 Women's National Cricket League season was the first season of the Women's National Cricket League, the women's domestic limited overs cricket competition in Australia. The tournament started on 16 November 1996 and finished on 5 January 1997. Five teams took part with New South Wales Breakers taking the trophy after defeating ladder-toppers Victorian Spirit by three games to zero in the finals series.

Ladder

Fixtures

1st final

2nd final

3rd final

Statistics

Most runs

Most wickets

References

External links
 Series home at ESPNcricinfo

 
Women's National Cricket League seasons
 
Women's National Cricket League